James Wayland Davis (born January 7, 1947) is an American politician and orthodontist who served as a member of the North Carolina General Assembly. He represented the Senate's fiftieth district, which includes Cherokee, Clay, Graham, Haywood, Jackson, Macon, and Swain counties from 2011 until 2021.

Early life and education 
Davis was born in Lynchburg, Virginia.  He attended Shenandoah Valley Academy, graduating in 1965. Davis earned his bachelor's degree from Southern Missionary College, now Southern Adventist University in 1969. He earned his DDS degree from Loma Linda University's School of Dentistry in 1974. In 1989, he graduated from Loma Linda with his MS in orthodontics.

Career 
Prior to operating an orthodontic practice in Franklin, North Carolina, Davis worked as a dentist.

Davis defeated four-term incumbent John J. Snow Jr. in the 2010 and 2012 elections. He defeated Jane Hipps in the 2014 and 2016 elections.

In 2014, Davis's death was falsely reported on Wikipedia in a hoax.

On December 19, 2019, Davis announced that he would be a candidate for Congress in 2020 to succeed incumbent Mark Meadows, who resigned from congress to serve as the 29th White House Chief of Staff. Davis placed third in the June 23, 2020 Republican primary.

References

External links

ncleg.net 

1947 births
Living people
American Seventh-day Adventists
Loma Linda University alumni
Republican Party North Carolina state senators
Politicians from Lynchburg, Virginia
People from Franklin, North Carolina
Southern Adventist University alumni
21st-century American politicians